Coleophora burmanni is a moth of the family Coleophoridae. It is found in Spain, France, Switzerland, Austria, Germany and Latvia.

The larvae feed on the leaves of Gypsophila fastigiata and Gypsophila repens.

References

burmanni
Moths described in 1952
Moths of Europe